Michael Koch (born January 13, 1966) is a German professional basketball coach and a retired professional player. He is the head coach of AEL Limassol of the Cyprus Basketball Division A. Prior to his stint in Bayreuth, he was the head coach of Telekom Baskets Bonn from 2005 to 2013.

Playing career
Koch played in Germany for MTV 1846 Giessen, Steiner Bayreuth, and TSV Bayer 04 Leverkusen. As a player of Bayreuth he won the German League championship (1989) and 2 German Cups (1988, 1989). Playing for Leverkusen Koch won 5 German League championships (1992, 1993, 1994, 1995, 1996) and 2 German cups (1993, 1995). He was the German League MVP in 1995.

In 1996, he moved to Panathinaikos. Playing for Panathinaikos, Koch won 4 Greek League championships (1998, 1999, 2000, 2001), the EuroLeague (2000), and the 1996 FIBA Intercontinental Cup. He was also a FIBA SuproLeague finalist (2001), and FIBA Saporta Cup semifinalist (1997–98).

In 2001, he moved to Maroussi Telestet and became FIBA Korać Cup semifinalist (2001–02). The next year he moved to Ionikos Neas Filadelfeias.

National team career
While playing for the senior men's German national basketball team, Koch won the gold medal at the EuroBasket 1993 at Germany. he also played at the 1987 EuroBasket, the 1995 EuroBasket, the 1986 FIBA World Championship, and the 1994 FIBA World Championship. He played 140 times for Germany between 1985 and 1998.

References

External links 
FIBA.com Profile
Eurobasket.com Profile

1966 births
Living people
Bayer Giants Leverkusen players
FIBA EuroBasket-winning players
German basketball coaches
German men's basketball players
Giessen 46ers players
Ionikos N.F. B.C. players
Maroussi B.C. players
Panathinaikos B.C. players
People from Lich, Germany
Sportspeople from Giessen (region)
Point guards
Shooting guards
Telekom Baskets Bonn coaches
1986 FIBA World Championship players
1994 FIBA World Championship players